A garlic festival is a food festival focused on garlic. Examples include:

United States
Gilroy Garlic Festival, an annual food festival in Gilroy, California
Hudson Valley Garlic Festival, in Saugerties, New York
Connecticut Garlic and Harvest Festival, in Bethlehem, Connecticut
Easton Garlic Fest, in Easton, Pennsylvania
North Quabbin Garlic and Arts Festival, in Orange, Massachusetts
Southern Vermont Garlic and Herb Festival, in Bennington, Vermont

United Kingdom
Isle of Wight Garlic Festival, an annual event held on the Isle of Wight, England

Estonia
, held in Jõgeva Parish, Jõgeva County

Finland
, held in Kerava, Uusimaa

References

Garlic
Festivals